John Green (1896–1927) was an English footballer who played in the Football League for Luton Town and Nottingham Forest. He emigrated to Canada in 1926 and died in a car accident a year later.

References

1896 births
1927 deaths
English footballers
Association football forwards
English Football League players
Blackburn Rovers F.C. players
Fleetwood Town F.C. players
Nottingham Forest F.C. players
Luton Town F.C. players
Southend United F.C. players
English emigrants to Canada
Road incident deaths in Canada